End Theory is the sixth studio album by South Korean singer Younha. It was released on November 16, 2021, through C9 Entertainment. It consists of eleven tracks, including the lead single "Stardust". The reissue version of the album, titled End Theory: Final Edition, was released on March 30, 2022.

Background and composition 
End Theory contains stories about different kinds of "end", like the end of the Earth, of a relationship, or of the universe, and conveys the singer's messages through metaphors related to the cosmos. It took eleven months to complete it, as Younha started working on it at the beginning of the COVID-19 pandemic. In an interview with Esquire Korea, the singer explained that she thought of using the end as a theme when she started thinking she needed to make an album to comfort people who couldn't meet and were waiting for it to end, "like singing a song about peace when war breaks out. To do that, you need to know what's at the end. [...] There should always be hope."

Younha wrote the lyrics, and sometimes the music, for most of the 11 songs; among them, the selection of the title track fell on pop ballad "Stardust", as she thought it showed the preciousness and the importance of the process from a beginning to an end better than the others. The song, which talks about the precious beings met on planet Earth and what true love is, was composed by her best friend and member of composition team Urban Zakapa Kwon Sun-il, with Younha penning the lyrics, and started from the question "What kind of useful person am I?" "P.R.R.W." stands for Process, Result and Reason Why.

Aside from Younha and Kwon, the producing team includes Jewno and James Son; the latter joined after appealing, through Kwon, to participate, leading Younha to ask him for a demo out of curiosity. The collaboration with Sarah Kang on "Tik-Tok" was born at the suggestion of Younha after seeing an acoustic live performance of Kang playing the guitar outdoors, and they worked on the song through video calls. The Korean title, which translates to "6 years and 230 days", refers to the days left to the destruction of the Earth.

On March 30, 2022, End Theory was repackaged as End Theory: Final Edition adding three additional songs, "C/2022YH", "Event Horizon" and "Black Hole", based on rock music. "C/2022YH", whose Korean title means "comet", is a pop rock fast tempo song with a 16-bit piano riff; "Event Horizon" is the name of the outer boundary of a black hole, a completely uncharted territory that Younha compared to a breakup, when no one knows what will happen next; "Black Hole" is a future bass pop song where she tells a black hole she will never forget the moment it was a star. Younha took charge of the lyrics and composition of all three songs.

Critical reception 

Son Gi-ho from IZM gave the album 4 out of 5 stars; he called it "intense" from the first track, stating: "All the songs in the album are sincere to capture both the person who rescued her and the music," and concluding "The light reached after countless attempts and failures gives Younha a chance to grow on her own and becomes a medium in the name of hope that will unite her and the public again. In that way, a solid galaxy that will not be shaken by any adversity is born."

Art Insight wrote: "Younha's End Theory doesn't erase the existence of sadness and failure from life, but looks straight ahead. [...] It contains confidence for tomorrow and gives support and comfort with a trustworthy message of 'I will be by your side'."

End Theory was featured on Time's list of the best K-pop songs and albums of 2021, while Billboard chose "Stardust" as the 13th best K-pop song of 2021 for its simplicity made of "simple, beautiful chord progression that grows naturally within the song's orchestral production."

Accolades

Track listing

Charts

Weekly charts

Monthly charts

References

External links
 
 
  at ManiaDB
  at ManiaDB
 

2021 albums
Korean-language albums
Younha albums